Marennes-Hiers-Brouage is a commune in the Charente-Maritime department in southwestern France. It was established on 1 January 2019 by merger of the former communes of Marennes (the seat) and Hiers-Brouage.

Population

See also
 Communes of the Charente-Maritime department

References

External links
 

Communes of Charente-Maritime
Populated places established in 2019
2019 establishments in France